The demographic profile of Cameroon is complex for a country of its population.  Cameroon comprises an estimated 250 distinct ethnic groups, which may be formed into five large regional-cultural divisions:
 western highlanders (Semi-Bantu or grassfielders), including the Bamileke, Bamum (or Bamoun), and many smaller Tikar groups in the Northwest (est. 38% of total population);
 coastal tropical forest peoples, including the Bassa, Duala (or Douala), and many smaller groups in the Southwest (12%);
 southern tropical forest peoples, including the Beti-Pahuin, Bulu (a subgroup of Beti-Pahuin), Fang (subgroup of Beti-Pahuin), Maka, Njem, and Baka pygmies (18%);
 predominantly Islamic peoples of the northern semi-arid regions (the Sahel) and central highlands, including the Fulani ( or Peuhl) (14%); and
 the "Kirdi", non-Islamic or recently Islamic peoples of the northern desert and central highlands (18%).

113,000 Igbo people live in Cameroon. The Cameroon government held two national censuses during the country's first 44 years as an independent country, in 1976 and again in 1987.  Results from the second head count were never published.  A third census, expected to take years to produce results, began on November 11, 2005, with a three-week interviewing phase.  It is one of a series of projects and reforms required by the International Monetary Fund as prerequisites for foreign debt relief. The first results were published in 2010.

Population

The proportion of children below the age of 15 in 2010 was 40.6%, 55.9% was between 15 and 65 years of age, while 3.5% was 65 years or older.

Population Estimates by Sex and Age Group (01.I.2010):

Population Estimates by Sex and Age Group (01.VII.2019):

Fertility and births
Total Fertility Rate (TFR) (Wanted Fertility Rate) and Crude Birth Rate (CBR):

Fertility data as of 2011 (DHS Program):

Vital statistics
Registration of vital events is in Cameroon not complete. The Population Departement of the United Nations prepared the following estimates.

Ethnic groups

Cameroon Highlanders 31%
Equatorial Bantu 19%
Kirdi 11%
Fulani 10%
Baggara Arabs (also called Arab Shuwa)
Hausa
Mafa
Kanuri
Northwestern Bantu 8%
Eastern Nigritic 7%
Other African 13%
Non-African less than 1%

Languages

There are 24 major African language groups in Cameroon; additionally, English and French are official languages. Cameroonian Pidgin English is also widely spoken.

Peoples concentrated in the Southwest and Northwest Provinces—around Buea and Bamenda—use standard English and Cameroonian Pidgin English, as well as their local languages. In the three northern provinces—Adamawa, North, and Far North—either French or Fulfulde (the language of the Fulani) is widely spoken. Elsewhere, French is the principal second language, although pidgin and some local languages such as Ewondo, the dialect of a Beti clan from the Yaoundé area, have a wide currency. In Far North Region the northernmost constituent province of Cameroon, Mafa Language Arab Shuwa (an Arab dialect) and is spoken by the Baggara Arabs (also called Arab Shuwa).

Indigenous languages of Cameroon include:
Arab Shuwa
Bamum
Basaa
Bikya
Bung
Kanuri
Ngumba
Yeni
Lamnso
Meta'
Mafa

Other demographic statistics 

Demographic statistics according to the World Population Review in 2022.

One birth every 34 seconds	
One death every 2 minutes	
One net migrant every 111 minutes	
Net gain of one person every 46 seconds

The following demographic statistics are from the CIA World Factbook.

Population
29,321,637 (2022 est.)
25,640,965 (July 2018 est.)
24,994,885 (2017 est.)
Note: estimates for this country explicitly take into account the effects of excess mortality due to AIDS; this can result in lower life expectancy, higher infant mortality and death rates, lower population and growth rates, and changes in the distribution of population by age and sex than would otherwise be expected (July 2018 est.)

Religion

Roman Catholic 38.3%, Protestant 25.5%, other Christian 6.9%, Muslim 24.4%, animist 2.2%, other 0.5%, none 2.2% (2018 est.)

Age structure

0-14 years: 42.34% (male 5,927,640/female 5,820,226)
15-24 years: 20.04% (male 2,782,376/female 2,776,873)
25-54 years: 30.64% (male 4,191,151/female 4,309,483)
55-64 years: 3.87% (male 520,771/female 552,801)
65 years and over: 3.11% (male 403,420/female 460,248) (2020 est.)

0-14 years: 42.15% (male 5,445,142 /female 5,362,166)
15-24 years: 19.6% (male 2,524,031 /female 2,502,072)
25-54 years: 31.03% (male 4,001,963 /female 3,954,258)
55-64 years: 3.99% (male 499,101 /female 524,288)
65 years and over: 3.23% (male 384,845 /female 443,099) (2018 est.)

Birth rate
35.53 births/1,000 population (2022 est.) Country comparison to the world: 14th
35 births/1,000 population (2018 est.) Country comparison to the world: 21st
35.4 births/1,000 population (2017 est.)

Death rate
7.73 deaths/1,000 population (2022 est.) Country comparison to the world: 101st
9.4 deaths/1,000 population (2018 est.) Country comparison to the world: 49th
9.6 deaths/1,000 population (2017 est.)

Total fertility rate
4.55 children born/woman (2022 est.) Country comparison to the world: 19th
4.58 children born/woman (2018 est.) Country comparison to the world: 24th
According to Cameroon government website, average children per woman was 5.0 in 2004, 4.7 in 2016.

Net migration rate
-0.31 migrant(s)/1,000 population (2022 est.) Country comparison to the world: 119th
-0.1 migrant(s)/1,000 population (2017 est.) Country comparison to the world: 104th
-0.1 migrants/1,000 population (2017 est.)

Mother's mean age at first birth
20.1 years (2018 est.)
note: median age at first birth among women 25-49

19.7 years (2011 est.)
note: median age at first birth among women 25-29

Median age
total: 18.5 years. Country comparison to the world: 209th
male: 18.2 years
female: 18.8 years (2020 est.)

total: 18.6 years. Country comparison to the world: 208th
male: 18.5 years 
female: 18.7 years (2018 est.)

total: 18.5 years
male: 18.4 years
female: 18.7 years (2017 est.)

Population growth rate
2.75% (2022 est.) Country comparison to the world: 15th
2.54% (2018 est.) Country comparison to the world: 20th
2.56% (2013 est.)

Urbanization
urban population: 58.7% of total population (2022)
rate of urbanization: 3.43% annual rate of change (2020-25 est.)

urban population: 56.4% of total population (2018)
rate of urbanization: 3.63% annual rate of change (2015-20 est.)

Urban population: 58% of total population (2010)
Rate of urbanization: 3.3% annual rate of change (2010–15 est.)

Sex ratio
At birth: 1.03 male(s)/female
Under 15 years: 1.02 male(s)/female
15-64 years: 1.01 male(s)/female
65 years and over: 0.85 male(s)/female
Total population: 1.01 male(s)/female (2009 est.)

Life expectancy at birth
total population: 63.27 years Country comparison to the world: 210th
male: 61.49 years
female: 65.09 years (2022 est.)

total population: 59 years
male: 57.6 years
female: 60.4 years (2017 est.)

Contraceptive prevalence rate
19.3% (2018)
34.4% (2014)

Dependency ratios
total dependency ratio: 85.9 (2015 est.)
youth dependency ratio: 80 (2015 est.)
elderly dependency ratio: 5.9 (2015 est.)
potential support ratio: 17 (2015 est.)

School life expectancy (primary to tertiary education)
total: 12 years
male: 13 years
female: 11 years (2016)

HIV/AIDS
Adult prevalence rate: 3.7% (2017 est.)
People living with HIV/AIDS: 510,000 (2017 est.)
Deaths: 24,000 (2017 est.)

Major infectious diseases
Degree of risk: very high
Food or waterborne diseases: bacterial and protozoal diarrhea, hepatitis A and hepatitis E, and typhoid fever
Vectorborne diseases: malaria and yellow fever
Water contact disease: schistosomiasis
Respiratory disease: meningococcal meningitis
Animal contact disease: rabies (2009)

Nationality
Noun: Cameroonian(s)
Adjective: Cameroonian

Literacy
Definition: age 15 and over can read and write
Total population: 77.1% (2018 est.)
Male: 82.6%
Female: 71.6%

Education expenditure
 2.8% of GDP (2013)

References

Attribution:

External links

  Institut National de la Statistique du Cameroun
Cameroon Undertakes Nationwide Census, a November 2005 article from Voice of America
UNDP. 2006. Beyond scarcity: Power, poverty and the global water crisis. Human Development Report 2006. New York: United Nations Development Programme (UNDP).

 
Society of Cameroon